Yelhou Mayek may refer to:
 Meitei Mayek, the generally accepted Meitei script
 Naoriya Phulo script, the invented Meitei Yelhou Mayek script